Parornix atripalpella is a moth of the family Gracillariidae. It is known from France, Germany, mainland Italy, Sardinia, Poland, Sweden and Switzerland.

The wingspan is 9–10 mm.

The larvae feed on Prunus spinosa. They mine the leaves of their host plant.

References

Parornix
Moths of Europe
Moths described in 1979